

Plants

Angiosperms

Arthropoda

Insects

Archosauromorpha

Newly named dinosaurs
Data courtesy of George Olshevsky's dinosaur genera list.

Remarks on newly named birds

 Palaeopteryx thomsoni Jensen, 1981. is most probably not a bird but perhaps a small dinosaur, it is best treated as a taxon non avium.
 Plegadis pharangites Olson, 1981. is a new name for Plegadis gracilis Miller et Bowman, 1956, preoccupied by Plegadis gracilis (Lydekker, 1891), described as Milnea gracilis Lydekker, 1891 and transferred to the genus Plegadis Kaup, 1829 by Cheneval, 1984.

Newly named birds

Plesiosaurs
 Carroll, R. C., 1981, Plesiosaur ancestors from the Upper Permian of Madagascar: Philosophical Transactions of the Royal Society of London B, v. 293, p. 315- 383.

Pterosaurs

New taxa

Synapsids

Non-mammalian

References

 
Paleontology
Paleontology 1